Jeffrey, Geoffrey, Geoff or Jeff Cooper may refer to:

Film
Jeff Cooper (actor) (c.1936–2018), Canadian television and film performer
Jeffrey Cooper (born 1968), American film editor on 2002's Book of Love

Military
Jeff Cooper (1920–2006), American Marine officer and handgun expert
Geoffrey Cooper (RAF officer) (1925–2014), British fighter pilot

Politicians
Geoffrey Cooper (politician) (1907–1995), English Labour MP for Middlesbrough West
Jeffrey Cooper, American Democratic candidate (United States House of Representatives elections, 2000)

Writers
Geoffrey M. Cooper, American biologist, academic and writer since 1970s
Geoff Cooper, American co-author of 2001's 4 x 4 at Delirium Books

Characters
Jeffrey Cooper in 1982's National Lampoon's Movie Madness